Macbeth is an indie rock band formed in November 2008 in Taipei, Taiwan by Charlie Shao. The band composes of Mai Su (bass/vocal), Howie Yu (guitar/vocal), Ian Chen (drum) and Michael Xu (keyboard).

Macbeth played their first gig at UnderWorld in July 2009, and was invited to play at the 2009 WHITE LABEL, Free Tibet Music, 2010 Megaport Music Festival, The Next Big Thing and many other music festivals. A report by Liberty Times in March 2010 recommended Macbeth as one of the Top Six Must-Hear Indie Bands in Taiwan, and Macbeth's original song, Red Light City had been ranked as top one in The Top Ten Songs Weekly on Street Voice for two weeks in June, 2010.

The band's sound contains a mix of rhythmic bass and synthesized guitar, and the frolicsome keyboard and drums offer joyful dance music element into their songs. Each composing Macbeth introduces new elements in order to provide the audiences endless pleasure and excitement of new sounds.

References 
http://www.taipeitimes.com/News/feat/archives/2010/06/18/2003475789

External links 
 Macbeth Official Website

Musical groups established in 2008
Taiwanese indie rock groups